George Crawford Hyndman (1796–1867) was an Irish auctioneer and amateur biologist.

He was the son of Cherry Crawford Hyndman (1766-1845)  and James Hyndman (1761?–1825), a Belfast Woollen merchant. Both parents, in the 1790s, were active in the republican Society of United Irishmen. In heavily garrisoned Belfast, neither appear to have been implicated in the 1798 rebellion, but, for whatever reason, James Hyndman did not join other merchants and local dignitaries in signing a proclamation published just before the risings to the north and south of the town in June, which expressed support for the government.

George was educated at the Belfast Academy until apprenticed to his father’s business at age 14. After his father died in 1825, he took the business over while devoting his leisure time to Irish natural history. He was particularly interested in the study of marine zoology and marine botany, especially molluscs and algae. His specimens of both groups may now be found in the Ulster Museum.

Hyndman was a member of the Belfast Dredging Committee (other members were George Dickie, Edward Waller and John Gwyn Jeffreys). This operated from 1857 to 1859, under grants from the British Association for the Advancement of Science.
William Thompson described Panningia hyndmani, a hermit crab for him as the discoverer in Belfast Lough.

He was also a founder member of the Belfast Natural History Society and contributed to S.A.Stewart and T.H.Corry's Flora of the North-east.

Anapagurus hyndmanni (Bell, 1845) as well as A. laevis and Pagurus cuanensis were also discovered by Hyndman at Portaferry (and Bangor) and named by Thompson (q.v.) without formal descriptions.

Other hermit crab species named for Hyndman were:
Escharina hyndmanni (Johnson, 1847)
Iophon hyndmani (Bowerbank, 1858)
Pseudione hyndmanni (Bate & Westwood, 1868).

The Ulster Museum has an 1854-62 archive  of  George Crawford Hyndman containing 20 letters from Francis Archer, Edward Benn, J. Bristow, Edward Charlesworth(1813–93) an  English naturalist and palaeontologist), A. Crawford, Robert Damon (1814-1889) Dorset geologist and dealer in fossils), George Dickie, Edmund Getty, John Gwyn Jeffreys, William Molony, R. W. Hincks, J. Morpan, Robert Patterson, Edward Waller (1803-1873) Irish land owner owner of a yacht used for dredgings) and Charles Ward.

Works

1853 Notes on the natural history of Tory Island. Ulster Journal of Archaeology 1: 34–37.
1857 Note on a curious monstrosity of the common shell (Fusus antiquus). Nat. Hist. : 250.
1858 Report of the Proceedings of the Belfast Dredging Committee. Report for the British Association for the Advancement of Science : 220-237 
1859 Report of the Belfast Dredging Committee. Report for the British Association for the Advancement of Science : 282-293 
1860 Report of the Belfast Dredging Committee for 1859. Report for the British Association for the Advancement of Science : 116-119  (Committee joined by Charles Wyville Thomson.

Most of Hyndman's discoveries are published with attribution in Thompson, William (edited by Patterson, R.) The Natural History of Ireland Volume 4: Mammalia, reptiles and fishes. Also, invertebrata. London: Henry G. Bohn, 1856

References

Chesney, H.C.G. 1995 Ireland's pioneering malacologists - from dredging to drummondi. Arch. Nat. Hist. 22: 229-239
Foster, J. W. and Chesney, H. C. G (eds.), 1977: Nature in Ireland: A Scientific and Cultural History. Lilliput Press. .

External links
About Ireland pdfs of The Natural History of Ireland

Algologists
Amateur biologists
19th-century Irish botanists
19th-century Irish zoologists
Scientists from Belfast
1796 births
1867 deaths
Marine botany